Plastic is a 2011 horror crime film.  It was written and directed by Jose Carlos Gomez and stars North Roberts, Colleen Boag, and Matthew Prochazka. The film was mostly shot in Villa Park, Illinois. Plastic has won several awards, and is now available on DVD and Video on Demand.

Premise
The story centers on serial killer Albert Mullin, and his final killing spree.

Production
Filmed mostly in Villa Park, Plastic was shot in fourteen days. Other locations included Chicago, Geneva, Illinois, and Elgin, Illinois.

Festivals and awards
 Indie Horror Film Festival, 2012; Best Supporting Actor (Christian Gray), and Directors Choice Award (Jose Carlos Gomez).
 Park City Film Music Festival, 2012; Official Selection.
 Fright Night Film Festival, 2012; Official Selection.
 Columbia Gorge International Film Festival, 2012; Official Selection.
 The Prairie State Film Festival, 2012; Best Feature, and Directors Choice Award.
 Action on Film International Festival, 2012; Official Selection.
 The Chicago Horror Film Festival, 2012; Seven nominations. Won Best Actor (North Roberts).
 Twin Rivers Media Festival, 2013; Official Selection.

Reception
Plastic achieved positive reviews from critics. Blood Sucking Geek's review noted, "Plastic creates tension buildup while involving the viewer in the individual characters, and then brings it to a smart, solid close."

References

External links

2011 horror films
American serial killer films
2011 films
2010s English-language films
2010s American films